The  is the first season of the Bleach anime series. The episodes are directed by Noriyuki Abe, and produced by TV Tokyo, Dentsu and Studio Pierrot. In the English release by Viz Media, the title is changed to The Substitute. The season adapts the first eight volumes (chapters 1–70) of Tite Kubo's Bleach manga series, spanning twenty episodes. The episodes' plot covers the adventures of Ichigo Kurosaki after becoming a Soul Reaper and assuming the duties of Soul Reaper Rukia Kuchiki.

The arc initially ran from October 5, 2004 to February 22, 2005 in Japan on TV Tokyo. The first English airing of the series was from September 9, 2006 until January 26, 2007. It was shown on YTV's Bionix programming block in Canada and Cartoon Network's Adult Swim in the United States, with Bionix airing the show one day sooner. The arc started airing in the UK starting in September 2007 on AnimeCentral.

The episodes use three pieces of theme music: one opening theme and two ending themes. The opening theme is Orange Range's single "Asterisk". The ending theme for the first thirteen episodes is "Life is Like a Boat" by Rie Fu, while the remaining seven used "Thank You!!" by Home Made Kazoku.

The arc was released on five DVD compilations, each containing four episodes of the show. They were released in Japan from February 2 to June 1, 2005. Viz Media's release of the DVDs was made from November 5 to July 31, 2007. The first of these compilations, with art featuring the series main character Ichigo Kurosaki, was nominated at the American Anime Awards in 2007 for best DVD package design. A DVD collection box, containing all twenty episodes of the arc, was released by Viz Media on October 30, 2007. Manga Entertainment released two DVDs containing the first season in the United Kingdom on November 5, 2007 and March 3, 2008. A compilation of these two volumes was released on May 5, 2008.



Episode list

References

General

Specific

2004 Japanese television seasons
2005 Japanese television seasons
Season 01